Michael Seth Brockers (born December 21, 1990) is an American football defensive tackle who is a free agent. He played college football at LSU. He was considered to be one of the best defensive tackle prospects in the 2012 NFL Draft, where he was drafted by the St. Louis Rams in the first round.

Early years
Brockers attended Chávez High School in Houston, Texas, where he was a two-sport athlete playing football and competed in track & field. During his junior season, he had 59 tackles and 10 sacks. As a senior, he led Chávez High School to the first round of the Texas Class 5A state playoffs, where they lost 31–26 to Humble. Brockers earned first-team All-region and All-state honors. In track & field, Brockers participated in the shot put and the discus.

Brockers was regarded as a four-star recruit by Rivals.com out of high school, he was rated as the No. 10 strong side defensive end prospect in the nation. He accepted a scholarship offer from LSU over other offers from Texas A&M and Texas Tech.

College career

Brockers attended Louisiana State University from 2009 to 2011. After redshirting his initial year at LSU, Brockers saw action in all 13 games of the 2010 season, as backing up Lazarius Levingston at left defensive tackle. He made his first career start against Alabama and picked up four tackles in the win over the Crimson Tide. As a sophomore in 2011, he started all 13 games and was third on the team with 9.5 tackles for a loss. He earned a second-team All-SEC selection by the Associated Press.

On January 12, 2012, Brockers announced that he would forgo his remaining two years of eligibility and enter the 2012 NFL Draft.

Professional career

St. Louis / Los Angeles Rams

The St. Louis Rams selected Brockers in the first round (14th overall) of the 2012 NFL Draft. Brockers was the first defensive end drafted in 2012. On June 7, 2012, the Rams signed Brockers to a four-year, $9.52 million contract that includes a signing bonus of $5.36 million. On December 9, 2012, against Buffalo Bills, Brockers ended the game with 7 tackles (4 solo), 1.5 sacks and a forced fumble. As a rookie in 2012, Brockers played 13 games with 33 tackles, four sacks, one pass defended, and one forced fumble.

In 2013, Brockers started all 16 games making 46 tackles, 5.5 sacks, and one forced fumble. In 2014, Brockers started all 16 games with 32 tackles, two sacks, one pass defended, and one fumble recovery.

On April 27, 2015, the Rams picked up the fifth-year option of Brockers's rookie contract. During the 2015 season, Brockers played 16 games making 44 tackles and three sacks.

On September 15, 2016, Brockers signed a three-year extension worth $33.125 million and $17 million guaranteed. Brockers finished 2016 by playing 14 games with 19 tackles and 2 passes defended.

In 2017, Brockers played all 16 games, finishing with 55 tackles, 4.5 sacks, and 4 passes defended. In 2018, Brockers played all 16 games, finishing with 54 tackles and a sack. The Rams reached Super Bowl LIII after defeating both the Dallas Cowboys and New Orleans Saints in the playoffs. The Rams played the New England Patriots in the Super Bowl, but lost 13–3 as Brockers recorded 7 tackles.

During the 2020 offseason, it was reported that Brockers was set to sign a three-year, $30 million contract with the Baltimore Ravens; however, the deal fell through due to concerns over his physical. On April 3, 2020, he signed a three-year, $24 million contract to return to the Rams. He was placed on the reserve/COVID-19 list by the team on December 31, 2020, and activated on January 8, 2021.

Detroit Lions
On March 17, 2021, the Rams traded Brockers to the Detroit Lions for a 2023 seventh round pick. He signed a new three-year, $24 million deal with the team.

On February 24, 2023, Brockers was released by the Lions.

References

External links

Official website
Los Angeles Rams profile
NFL Combine Profile
LSU Tigers bio
NFL Draft Profile

1990 births
Living people
Players of American football from Houston
American football defensive tackles
American football defensive ends
LSU Tigers football players
Los Angeles Rams players
St. Louis Rams players
Detroit Lions players